Red Room may refer to:

Art and entertainment 
 "The Red Room" (short story), an 1894 short story by H. G. Wells
 The Red Room (French novel), a 2001 novel by Nicci French
 The Red Room (Strindberg novel), 1879
 The Dessert: Harmony in Red (The Red Room), a 1908 painting by Henri Matisse
 The Red Room, a 2010 mixtape by Game
 Red Room (comics), a fictional Soviet training program featured in Marvel Comics
 Red Room (film), a 1999 Japanese horror film
 "Red Room" (song), a 2019 song by American rapper Offset
 Red Room (tour), a 2017-2018 concert tour by the Korean girl group Red Velvet

Companies 
 The Red Room Theatre Company, a London-based theatre company

Other uses 
 Red Room (White House), a state parlor in the White House
 Black and White Lodges, from Twin Peaks, commonly referred to as "the red room"
 An urban legend referring to a hidden service or website on the dark web, depicting the live torture and murder of individuals
 An area of the haunted house described in the 1977 book The Amityville Horror
 A room for BDSM activities in the Fifty Shades trilogy
 A room and a symbol in the gothic 1847 novel Jane Eyre by Charlotte Brontë
 ""Red Room Curse"" A late 1990s Japanese flash animation and rumor.

See also 
 Red chamber (disambiguation)
 Red hall (disambiguation)
 Redrum (disambiguation)